Robert Finch (born 1943) is an American author, essayist, and radio commentator.

Biography
He was born in New Jersey and grew up in West Virginia. He has lived in Cape Cod since 1971 and has written several books about the nature, natural and human histories of Cape Cod. His first book, Common Ground: A Naturalist's Cape Cod (1981), was nominated for the Pulitzer Prize for non-fiction in 1982.

Robert Finch has served as publications director for the Cape Cod Museum of Natural History and as a staff member of the Bread Loaf Writers' Conference at Middlebury College. His radio show with the National Public Radio member station WGBH, titled "A Cape Cod Notebook", won the 2006 "New England Edward R. Murrow Award for Best Radio Writing." For ten years, Finch also taught creative nonfiction in the Spalding University Master of Fine Arts program.

Awards 
 Nomination for Pulitzer Prize (Common Ground, 1981) 
 Fellowship, Bread Loaf Writers' Conference, 1982 
 New England Literary Lights Award, Associates of the Boston Public Library, 1999  
 New England Booksellers Association Non-Fiction Award for 2001 
 Notable Essays, The Best American Essays, 2000, ed. Alan Lightman 
 Notable Essays, The Best American Essays 2006, ed. Lauren Slater 
 2005 Edward R. Murrow Award for Radio Writing 
 2013 Edward R. Murrow Award for Radio Writing

Praise for Robert Finch
Annie Dillard said: "Robert Finch is one of our finest observers...I admire his essays very much for their strength, subtlety, and above all their geniality."

Bibliography

Collections of Essays
 Common Ground: A Naturalist's Cape Cod, W. W. Norton, 1981. . 
 The Primal Place, W. W. Norton, 1983. .
 Outlands: Journey to the Outer Edges of Cape Cod (1986) 
 Advisory Editor, On Nature (Daniel Halpern, Ed.), North Point Press, 1987.
 The Norton Book of Nature Writing (Co-Editor), W. W. Norton (1990, Second Edition, 2002) (co-edited with John Elder)
 The Cape Itself (with photographs by Ralph Mackenzie), W. W. Norton, 1991. . 
 A Place Apart: A Cape Cod Reader (Editor), W. W. Norton, 1993. . 
 Cape Cod: Its Natural and Cultural History, National Park Service. 1994.  
 The Smithsonian Guide to Natural America: Southern New England: Massachusetts, Connecticut, Rhode Island (co-authored with Jonathan Wallen), 1996. 
 Death of a Hornet: and Other Cape Cod Essays, 2001. .
 Special Places on Cape Cod and The Islands, Commonwealth Editions, 2003. 
 The Iambics of Newfoundland: Notes from an Unknown Shore, 2007. .
 A Cape Cod Notebook, 2011. . 
 A Cape Cod Notebook 2, Clock & Rose Press, 2016.
 The Outer Beach: A Thousand-Mile Walk on Cape Cod’s Atlantic Shore, W. W. Norton, 2017. .

References

External links
"A Cape Cod Notebook" from the WCAI website

Living people
1943 births
American nature writers
American male non-fiction writers